Tetragonoderus oxyomus is a species of beetle in the family Carabidae. It was described by Maximilien Chaudoir in 1876.

References

oxyomus
Beetles described in 1876